Contra viento y marea (English: Against All Odds) is a Mexican telenovela produced by Nicandro Díaz González for Televisa in 2005.

The telenovela was the last acting role of Beatriz Sheridan, who died in 2006 from a heart attack.

On Monday, April 25, 2005, Canal de las Estrellas started broadcasting Contra viento y marea weekdays at 8:00pm, replacing Apuesta por un amor. The last episode was broadcast on Friday, November 4, 2005 with Barrera de amor replacing it on Monday, November 7, 2005. On Monday, September 12, 2005, Univisión started broadcasting it at 8pm.

Marlene Favela and Sebastián Rulli starred as protagonists; Adriana Fonseca starred as co-protagonist, while Azela Robinson, Ernesto D'Alessio, Alberto Estrella and the leading actress Beatriz Sheridan starred as antagonists. Kika Edgar and the leading actress Evita Muñoz "Chachita" starred as stellar performances.

Plot
Natalia Ríos is a lovely young girl who lives with her aunt Inés. Her aunt’s husband, Arcadio, is a shameless man who tries to rape Natalia and ends up selling her into white slavery to a gang of thugs. One of them, Valente, takes pity on the innocent young girl. He saves her and they both run away, but are soon found by the criminals. Valente confronts them to give Natalia a chance to escape and is badly wounded. Natalia is able to get away and goes back to her aunt, only to find her on her deathbed. Inés tells her that, from now on, she must live with Doña Carlota at the home of the wealthy Serrano family. When Natalia arrives at the mansion, Don Teodoro and his daughter Sandra welcome her with open arms, but his wife Apolonia, Doña Carlota’s daughter, treats her with contempt.

Sebastián lives with his adoptive family: Amparo, who has always rejected him; her son Eduardo, who loves and is loyal to Sebastián, thinking they are really brothers; and the grandmother, Doña Cruz. One night, Eduardo is attacked by a drunkard and Sebastián defends him, leaving the attacker unconscious in the street. A street bum who witnessed the fight then robs and kills the man, but Sebastián is blamed for the murder and sent to prison.

Years later, Natalia and Eduardo become friends in college. She is truly fond of him, but only as a friend. Eduardo, however, falls madly in love with her. Sebastián is released for good behavior and meets Natalia during an embarrassing incident where he must defend her from his inebriated friends. Even though they haven’t met again after that first encounter, Natalia and Sebastián cannot stop thinking about each other, and Eduardo and Sebastián do not realize that they have fallen in love with the same woman.

Sebastián is desperate because no one will give him a job, so he decides to try his luck in Mexico City. There, fate brings him face to face with Natalia once more, and they finally confess their love for each other. Natalia promises to find him work at the Serrano family’s tuna cannery, where she herself is employed, and they both go back to Comala. Meanwhile, Apolonia is searching for the illegitimate son she had in her youth and gave up for adoption to Amparo’s husband. Amparo sees the chance to benefit her own child and tells Apolonia that Eduardo is her son. In an attempt to win his love, Apolonia gives him a job at the cannery and decides to make all his wishes come true. When she learns that Eduardo is in love with Natalia, Apolonia does everything in her power to force her to marry him, but Natalia’s love belongs to Sebastián and she will not give in to Apolonia’s pressure.

It is only when Eduardo falls gravely ill and is not expected to live long that Natalia must decide whether she should marry him out of compassion, or be true to her heart and defend her love for Sebastian "Against All Odds".

Cast

Main

 Marlene Favela as Natalia Ríos
 Sebastián Rulli as Sebastián Cárdenas
 Adriana Fonseca as Sandra Serrano Rudell
 Azela Robinson as Apolonia Rudell de Serrano. Main villain. Wife of Teodoro, lover of Valente, later his wife, hates Sebastián and Natalia, likes Eduardo, believes that he is her son, obsessed with him. Responsible for murders.  Poisoned by her mother, Carlota, because she wanted to save her from the jail
 Kika Edgar as Regina Campos / Luna gitana. Usurps the place of her brother Alvaro to get revenge on Apolonia
 Ernesto D'Alessio as Eduardo Cárdenas. In love with Natalia. Good at first, but turns villain, when he comes to known that Sebastiancito is not his son. He becomes lover and accomplice of Apolonia and wants to revenge on Sebastian and Natalia. He organizes his own dead. Ends up in jail.
 Armando Araiza as Imanol Balmaceda Sandoval. Good at first, but turns villain, obsessed with Sandra and mishandles her, because she cheated him earlier. Ends up in insane asylum
 Alberto Estrella as Valente Ortigoza / Franco Gallardo. Villain. In love with Natalia, hates Sebastián and wanted to kill him on Isla Yacaré. He saves him in the end of the story and repents his maleficence
 Evita Muñoz "Chachita" as Doña Cruz Cárdenas
 Beatriz Sheridan as Doña Carlota Vda. de Rudell. Apollonia's mother, villain, commits suicide with drinking poison
 Luis Couturier as Don Teodoro Serrano Killed by Rodas and Valente. When he was murdered, was staying there Veneno, Cheleque and Almeja, Carlota, Valente and Rodas, Lucía and also Amparo.
 Silvia Manríquez as Amparo Contreras de Cárdenas, villain, turns good
 Alexis Ayala as Ricardo Sandoval, villain, but turns good. Killed by Tuerto to order of Apollonia

Supporting
 Roberto Ballesteros as Arcadio, villain in the first episode
 Miguel Galván as Adán Pescador 
 Julio Camejo as Saúl Trejo "Veneno". Villain, turns good
 Juan Carlos Serrán as Comandante Ruiz
 Mariana Ávila as Zarela Balmaceda Sandoval
 Marco Méndez as Renato Alday
 Yula Pozo as Tirsa
 Yolanda Ventura as Isabel
 Miguel Ángel Biaggio as Cuco
 Nicky Mondellini as Constanza Sandoval de Balmaceda. 
 Carmen Amezcua as Lucía Campos
 Silvia Suárez as Adelina
 Irina Areu as La Colorada, villain, works for Apolonia
 Lucero Lander as Inés
 Federico Pizarro as Alvaro Campos
 Aleida Núñez as Perla
 Alex Sirvent as Chema
 Daniel Habiff as Frank Balmaceda Sandoval, villain, later good
 Uberto Bondoni as Almeja. villain, later good
 José Luis Cantú as Cheleque villain, later good
 Luis Fernando Madriz as Chito
 Myrrah Saavedra as Yuraima
 Ursula Monserrat as Rita
 Xorge Noble as Cuasimodo "El Tuerto," villain, hired killer, accomplice of Apolonia, arrested by the police
 Carlos Balart as Fidel Rodas, villain, works for Valente, wants to kill Sebastián and Natalia on Isla Yacaré, killed by Valente
 Sergio Acosta as Mike, villain, hired killer, turns good and helps Natalia and Sebastian
 Lis Vega as Juncal
 Óscar Morelli as General Valdez
 Julio Monterde as Padre Dimas
 Elizabeth Álvarez as Minerva de Lizárraga, villain, turns good
 Miguel Garza as Fabricio
 Ana Luisa Peluffo as Bibi de la Macorra
 Paty Romero as Odalys #1
 Jackeline Arroyo as Odalys #2
 Gloria Chávez as Vilma
 Marisol González as Melissa
 Gerardo Quiroz
 Alfonso Munguía as Domingo Rojas
 Luis Fernando Madriz as "Chito"
 Charly Alberto as Benigno 
 Rubén Olivares "El Púas" as Rubén
 Vicente Herrera as Macaco, villain, works for Valente
 Mario Figueroa as Fabián
 Fabián Robles as Jerónimo

Guests stars
 Arturo Peniche as Nazario
 Jorge Poza as Mateo Lizárraga
 Danna Paola as Natalia (child)
 Daniela Aedo as Sandra (child)
 Ángel Mar as Sebastian (child) 
 Sebastián as Eduardo (child)

Awards

References

External links

  at Esmas.com 

2005 telenovelas
Mexican telenovelas
2005 Mexican television series debuts
2005 Mexican television series endings
Television shows set in Mexico
Televisa telenovelas
Mexican television series based on Venezuelan television series
Spanish-language telenovelas